Meterotiaceae is a family of mosses from the order Hypnales. There are about 30 genera and 260 species represented by the family.

Description
Characteristic traits of the family include creeping stems with pendent branches, elongate, mostly papillose laminal cells, and pointed leaves. The taxonomy and phylogenetic relationships of this complex group of mosses are difficult to interpret, and attempts to structure the taxon are ongoing.

Distribution
Species of Meteoriaceae are found in warm topical and subtropical regions worldwide. Their primary substrate is on twigs and bark.

Classification
Meteoriaceae was originally classified under in the order Leucodontales, but are now within the Hypnales. The family contains the following genera:
Barbella
Papillaria
Zelometeorium

References

Hypnales
Moss families